Richard de Burgh may refer to:

 Richard Mor de Burgh (c. 1194–1242), eldest son of William de Burgh
 Richard Óg de Burgh, 2nd Earl of Ulster (1259–1326), Irish nobleman
 Richard Burke, 4th Earl of Clanricarde (1572–1635), Irish nobleman
 Richard Burke, 8th Earl of Clanricarde (d.1704), Irish nobleman
 Risdeárd de Burca, 6th Mac William Íochtar (died 1473), Irish chieftain and noble